The Diocese of Roskilde is a diocese within the Evangelical Lutheran Church of Denmark. The seat of the Bishop is Roskilde Cathedral in Roskilde.

History

The Diocese of Roskilde was formed in 1922 when the Diocese of Zealand was divided into the Diocese of Copenhagen and the Diocese of Roskilde.

Bishops of Roskilde
1923–1934 Henry Fonnesbech-Wulff
1935–1953 Axel Rosendal
1953–1969 Gudmund Schiøler
1969–1980 Hans Kvist
1980–1997 
1997–2008 Jan Lindhardt
2008-2022 Peter Fischer-Møller
2022-present Ulla Thorbjørn Hansen

See also
Church of Denmark
Ancient See of Roskilde

References

Church of Denmark dioceses
Diocese of Roskilde
1922 establishments in Denmark